Buenaventura Nepomuceno Matallana (September 1891 – 24 January 1960) was a Colombian criminal, murderer, and suspected serial killer. He was tried and sentenced to 24 years imprisonment for the 1949 murder of merchant Alfredo Forero Vanegas, and he was also suspected to be responsible for the disappearances of at least six or seven others to whom he pretended to be a lawyer, signing broad powers over his properties under the pretext of a big business, after which the clients either disappeared or were found dead.

Trial and conviction 
His trial, prolonged and complicated by deceit of the defendant's legal expert and by the weakness of the research organizations, caused great sensation and expectation in the Colombian society. The judge had to borrow a theater to hold the hearings, due to the large number of people present. Gabrial García Márquez said in one of his chronicles that "...the public hearings that are held in Bogotá to judge Nepomuceno Matallana, the famous Doctor Mata, are making competition to The right to be born", referring to the radionovela that caused the greatest national harmony.

During his trial he escaped twice, once during the riots of April 9, 1948. Concerning of what he was accused, Matallana never confessed his guilt. The unanimous verdict of the jury was to condemn him to the maximum penalty of 24 years according to what was then the force in Colombia. In the same conditions, Hipólito Herrera, the accomplice active in Forero's murder, was convicted and confessed to the police the exact location of where the body was buried in exchange for chicken broth. However, while serving the sentence in the Panóptico prison in Tunja, Matallana declared that the trial had flaws in the procedures, and at the end of the 50s, the second public hearing was started against him for the "Crime of Calderitas" (the nickname the press gave to Forero's murder case, as the body was found in the Calderitas wasteland).

Death 
On 24 January 1960, Matallana died in the Modelo prison of Bogotá infirmary while waiting for the result of the new verdict. His death was caused by bronchitis with heart failure. Two days later, he received a religious ceremony in the National Voto temple, after which he was buried in the Central Cemetery of Bogotá.

See also
List of serial killers by country

References

Bibliography

External links
 Criminalia.es article

1891 births
1960 deaths
Burials at Central Cemetery of Bogotá
Colombian people convicted of murder
Colombian people who died in prison custody
Impostors
People from Boyacá Department
Prisoners who died in Colombian detention
Suspected serial killers